Open History Project is an international community of writers, oral historians and digital activists that translate and gather interviews on global and historical topics. The organization was founded by Justin Shenk and Lena Dorfschmidt. In 2017, it became an independent non-profit incorporated in Osnabrück, Germany under Open History e.V.

Open History Project includes several hundred volunteers and translators.

Open History Project serves as a resource for academics. Interviews from the site have been published in the academic journals Global Studies of Childhood and Voluntaris.

References

External links
 
 Lena Dorfschmidt (Co-founder of Open History Project) in Interview with German Radio station NDR1

Citizen media
Multilingual news services
Organizations established in 2014
News agencies based in Germany